is the 9th Case Closed feature film, released on April 9, 2005. The film resulted in 2.15 billion yen, significantly less than the previous five films.

Plot
The 9th annual Detective Conan film sets sail on a 100 million yen luxurious cruise. Fifteen years ago, a cruise named Yashiromaru, built by the Yashiro group, sank while sailing. In the present, a new cruise, the Saint Aphrodite, was built by the Yashiro group and Conan and the rest were invited through Sonoko. Earlier, the husband of the CEO of the Yashiro family group, an established ship architect, had a heart-attack and drove his car down a cliff. On the second day of the cruise, the CEO herself was found murdered in her room. Later, her father, the President of the Yashiro group was also found missing. He had been thrown off the cruise into the ocean, seemingly by the same person. At the welcoming party, Kogoro shows off his deduction skills, and concluded that the sub-designer of the cruise, Akiyoshi, was the murderer. However, Conan has different ideas. Kusaka, a scriptwriter who worked in co-operation with Akiyoshi on a script, was the culprit. Kusaka reveals that the accident from 15 years ago was a scheme to sink the ship deliberately to get insurance. His father was murdered when he discovered the captain of the ship was drugged and left to die. Kusaka immediately set off bombs and escaped by sea and the Detective Boys gave chase. After they successfully took down the criminal, more bombs were ignited. All passengers were evacuated, but Ran returned to her hiding place during the hide-and-seek game to find a "gold medal" made by sea-shells the Detective Boys made for her. However, as the ship swayed, she fainted in the enclosed area.

It turns out Akiyoshi was the main murderer after all, and she was the one who did all three killings and made Kusaka think that he did them himself. She also revealed that her father was the captain who died while the cruise ship sank. Kogoro, however, deduced correctly this time and managed to arrest Akiyoshi. He was originally trying to find evidence to prove her innocence because of her strong resemblance to his wife, but the more investigation he does, the more guilty she became. As Kogorou and Conan began to evacuate, they found out that Ran was missing. They find her under the deck of the boat with the help of a fire axe. Afterwards a helicopter comes and picks them up. At the post credits, Conan explained he knew where Ran was because when he kicked the volleyball, Ran said she heard a soccer ball, meaning she was in a place with a tough wall. The detective kids come, and told Ran they made a better "gold medal" for her, and put it on her.

Cast
Akira Kamiya as Kogoro Mori
Kappei Yamaguchi as Shinichi Kudo
Minami Takayama as Conan Edogawa
Wakana Yamazaki as Ran Mori
Chafurin as Inspector Megure
Atsuko Yuya as Officer Sato
Ikue Ohtani as Mitsuhiko Tsuburaya
Megumi Hayashibara as Ai Haibara
Naoko Matsui as Sonoko Suzuki
Wataru Takagi  as Genta Kojima and Officer Takagi
Yukiko Iwai as Ayumi Yoshida
Kazuhiko Inoue as Inspector Shiratori
Chinami Nishimura as Natsuho Tsujimoto
Isshin Chiba as Detective Chiba
Kenichi Ogata as Professor Agasa
Kinryū Arimoto as Kensuke Nima
Kōji Yusa as Katsuhiko Shiomi
Kōichi Yamadera as Hironari Kusaka
Yoshiko Sakakibara as Minako Akiyoshi

Music
It was released on April 20, 2005. Along with The Fourteenth Target, this is the second theme song wrote by Zard.

The official soundtrack was released on April 6, 2005. It costs ¥3059, including tax.

Home media

DVD
The DVD was released on December 14, 2005. The DVD contains the film and the trailer, and costs ¥6090 including tax.

Blu-ray
The Blu-ray version of the film was released on January 28, 2011. The Blu-ray contains the same content of the DVD plus a mini-booklet explaining the film and the BD-live function.

References

External links
 
Official TMS website  
Official TMS website  

2005 anime films
TMS Entertainment
Toho animated films
Films directed by Yasuichiro Yamamoto
Strategy above the Depths
Films set on cruise ships